John Maessner (born June 2, 1969 in Hackensack, New Jersey) who spent six seasons in Major League Soccer, two in France, two in USISL, two in the National Professional Soccer League and one in Germany.

Player

Youth
Maessner was a 1987 Parade Magazine High School All American soccer player. In 1987, he entered the University of Virginia where he played on the men's soccer team until 1990. In 1989, the Cavaliers won the NCAA championship. He lost much of his senior season with a broken foot, but came back in time for the post-season tournaments. Although he turned professional in 1991, he continued to work on his degree, graduating in 1992. In 1991, he was a member of the U.S. soccer at the 1991 World University Games.

Professional
On May 2, 1991, Maessner turned professional when he signed with the Fort Lauderdale Strikers of the American Professional Soccer League. He played eleven games as the Strikers went to the playoff semifinals.  On September 22, 1991, the Harrisburg Heat selected Maessner in the National Professional Soccer League draft. He played only seven games for the Heat that season. In 1992, he moved south to the Miami Freedom before moving to France where he signed with fifth division ES La Ciotat. He then moved to FC Istres in the French Ligue 2.  He returned to the United States in 1994 where he signed with the Connecticut Wolves in the USISL.  In January 1995, he signed with the Buffalo Blizzard of the NPSL.  In 1995, he returned to the Wolves for a second season before moving to Germany to play for FC Saarbrücken during the 1995–1996 2. Fußball-Bundesliga season. On May 13, 1996, D.C. United acquired Messner from FC Saarbrücken.  He played three seasons in D.C., winning the 1996 MLS Cup and 1997 MLS Cup. On November 9, 1997, the Miami Fusion selected Maessner in the 1997 MLS Expansion Draft. July 19, 1999, Miami sent Maessner back to D.C. United in exchange for Brian Kamler and future considerations. The future considerations turned out to be Roy Lassiter.  On May 26, 2000, D.C. United traded Maessner, two first round picks in the 2001 MLS SuperDraft and a 2002 MLS SuperDraft second round pick to the Tampa Bay Mutiny in exchange for Raúl Díaz Arce.  He spent the remainder of the 2000 season as well as the 2001 season in Tampa Bay. He retired at the end of the 2001 season.

Coach
After retiring, Maessner returned to the University of Virginia as an assistant soccer coach. In January 2007, D.C. United named Maessner as the club's Director of Youth Development for D.C. United. Maessner is no longer with D.C. United as the technical director.

John Maessner named interim head women's soccer coach at the University of Nebraska at Kearney on July 25, 2012.

Notes

External links
John Maessner: Director of Youth Development

1969 births
Living people
American expatriate soccer players
American Professional Soccer League players
American soccer players
Buffalo Blizzard players
Connecticut Wolves players
FC Istres players
Fort Lauderdale Strikers (1988–1994) players
Harrisburg Heat players
Major League Soccer players
Miami Freedom players
Miami Fusion players
National Professional Soccer League (1984–2001) players
Sportspeople from Hackensack, New Jersey
Tampa Bay Mutiny players
D.C. United players
1. FC Saarbrücken players
USISL players
Virginia Cavaliers men's soccer players
Soccer players from New Jersey
ES La Ciotat players
Association football midfielders
Association football forwards
Expatriate footballers in France
American expatriate sportspeople in France
American expatriate soccer players in Germany